Big Hole is a large maar (explosion crater) in the Fort Rock basin of  Lake County, central Oregon, northeast of Crater Lake, near Oregon Route 31.

It is close to another smaller, but less-eroded maar crater, Hole-in-the-Ground.

See also
 Crack in the Ground
 Hole-in-the-Ground

References

External links
 
 

Maars of Oregon
Landforms of Lake County, Oregon